New Attitude is the second and final studio album by Australian girl group Young Divas, released on 24 November 2007 by Sony BMG. It is the first album to feature vocals by Jessica Mauboy, who replaced Ricki-Lee Coulter  after she left the group to resume her solo career. Much like their debut album, New Attitude features more covers. The album debuted at number 10 on the ARIA Albums Chart and was certified gold by the Australian Recording Industry Association (ARIA), for shipments of 35,000 copies.

A cover of Loverboy's "Turn Me Loose", which featured New Zealand rapper Savage, was released as the only single from the album, and peaked at number 15 on the ARIA Singles Chart.

Track listing

Charts and certifications

Weekly chart

Year-end charts

Certification

Release history

References

2007 albums
Young Divas albums
Covers albums
Sony Music Australia albums
Contemporary R&B albums by Australian artists